Raza Jaffrey (born 28 May 1973) is a British actor and singer. His roles include Zafar Younis on the BBC One spy drama series Spooks, Neal Hudson on the CBS medical drama Code Black, and Lieutenant Colonel Aasar Khan in season 4 of the Showtime series Homeland.

Early life
Jaffrey was born in Liverpool, Merseyside. His father Hyder Jaffrey was born in Agra, India and later moved to Pakistan after Partition. He then emigrated to the UK to train in the merchant navy and later became a captain. Hyder met Joan Bradshaw, an Irish Catholic Liverpudlian in the 1950s and they lived in Karachi, Pakistan for a decade. The couple married in 1962 and had four children of which Raza was the youngest. He grew up in London and was educated at Dulwich College between 1986 and 1991, alongside actors Rupert Penry-Jones and Chiwetel Ejiofor. Jaffrey's initial career aspiration was to become a Royal Air Force pilot and he passed the entrance exams for it and went on to study English and Drama at Manchester University with the intention of gaining a degree to join officer training. However while at university, he became interested in acting and joined the Bristol Old Vic Theatre School after graduation.

While at university, he appeared in several plays at the Edinburgh Festival Fringe, including The London Vertigo by Brian Friel, and at the Pendley Open Air Shakespeare Festival, including Henry VIII and A Comedy of Errors. In his final year at Manchester, he worked with Royal Shakespeare Company chief associate director Gregory Doran, which he has cited as one of the things that led him to apply for Bristol Old Vic Theatre School and eventually go on to become a professional actor. Throughout his time at Manchester, he was also the lead singer of a jazz funk band. He also participated on America's Next Top Model.

Career
Jaffrey has worked extensively on stage, appearing in Romeo and Juliet (Haymarket Theatre), Cyrano De Bergerac (Theatre Royal), East Is East (Oldham Coliseum), and 14 Songs, 2 Weddings, and a Funeral (Lyric Hammersmith, Birmingham Repertory Theatre). His break came in 2001 when he was cast as Sky in Mamma Mia! at the Prince Edward Theatre, London, directed by Phyllida Lloyd. From this, he went on to land the leading role in Andrew Lloyd Webber's production of A. R. Rahman's Bombay Dreams at the Apollo Theatre, London, directed by Steven Pimlott. He won rave reviews for his performance, with the BBC hailing him as "the most exciting new leading man to emerge in a London musical since Hugh Jackman became an overnight star in the National Theatre production of Oklahoma".

After leaving Bombay Dreams he appeared in ITV1's  M.I.T.: Murder Investigation Team, the HBO/BBC co-production Dirty War, and the three-part BBC drama Life Isn't All Ha Ha Hee Hee. In 2005, he began work on the BBC One spy drama series Spooks as agent Zafar Younis. During that time, he returned to the stage, playing Orsino in Shakespeare's Twelfth Night at the Albery Theatre, London, and was cast in the David Cronenberg film Eastern Promises.

Jaffrey left Spooks to join the BBC One drama series Mistresses and went on to star in Sharpe's Peril and the films Infinite Justice, for which he won the Best Supporting Actor Award at the Kara Film Festival, The Crew, and Harry Brown. In 2010, he appeared in Sex and the City 2 as Gaurav. He then went on to star as cheating boyfriend Mike in the BBC1 comedy Accidental Farmer.

In 2011, he appeared as the French supervillain Cain on the NBC superhero drama The Cape before working for NBC again on the Steven Spielberg–produced drama Smash, airing in early 2012. In Smash, he played Dev, the English boyfriend of a rising Broadway star, working as a press officer in the New York Mayor's office. He did not return to the show for its second season.

Jaffrey still continues to sing and has performed in several concert productions, including singing at the London Palladium with the Royal Philharmonic Orchestra, and with the BBC Concert Orchestra for BBC Radio 2. He was also the creator and co-producer of the dance show RED, a celebration of dozens of styles of movement and dance, brought together by their influences on and from India. He took the show to Johannesburg's Nelson Mandela Theatre. He played the role of Billy Flynn in Chicago at the Garrick Theatre in London.

Personal life
Jaffrey married actress Miranda Raison in 2007. They divorced two years later. In 2012, Jaffrey began a relationship with actress Lara Pulver. The couple married two years later. The couple have a son and daughter.

Filmography

Film

Television

Radio

References

External links

1975 births
Living people
20th-century English male actors
21st-century English male actors
English male stage actors
English male television actors
English male film actors
English male actors of South Asian descent
British male actors of Indian descent
People educated at Dulwich College
Male actors from Liverpool
Alumni of the University of Manchester
Alumni of Bristol Old Vic Theatre School